Events from the year 2015 in Michigan. Top stories of 2015 included:
 The Flint water crisis, including a declaration of emergency by Flint's mayor on December 15 and the resignation of MDEQ Director Dan Wyant on December 29
 The emergence of Detroit from the Detroit bankruptcy
 The conviction of Bob Bashara in the Death of Jane Bashara
 The trial of Charles Pugh for having sex with a minor
 The role of two Michigan nurses in the June 24 Supreme Court decision (Obergefell v. Hodges) legalizing gay marriage
 The extramarital affair (and use of taxpayer funds to cover it up) between two freshmen Tea Party legislators (Todd Courser and Cindy Gamrat)
 The legal battle by Richard Wershe Jr., aka "White Boy Rick", to win his freedom
 Efforts to eradicate the New Zealand mud snail from Michigan waterways.

Office holders

State office holders

 Governor of Michigan: Rick Snyder (Republican)
 Lieutenant Governor of Michigan: Brian Calley (Republican) 
 Michigan Attorney General: Bill Schuette (Republican)
 Michigan Secretary of State: Ruth Johnson (Republican)
 Speaker of the Michigan House of Representatives: Kevin Cotter (Republican)
 Majority Leader of the Michigan Senate: Arlan Meekhof (Republican)
 Chief Justice, Michigan Supreme Court: Robert P. Young Jr.

Mayors of major cities

 Mayor of Detroit: Mike Duggan (Democrat)
 Mayor of Grand Rapids: George Heartwell
 Mayor of Warren, Michigan: James R. Fouts
 Mayor of Ann Arbor: Christopher Taylor (Democrat)
 Mayor of Lansing: Virgil Bernero
 Mayor of Flint: Dayne Walling/Karen Weaver

Federal office holders

 U.S. Senator from Michigan: Debbie Stabenow (Democrat)
 U.S. Senator from Michigan: Gary Peters (Democrat) 
 House District 1: Dan Benishek (Republican)
 House District 2: Bill Huizenga (Republican)
 House District 3: Justin Amash (Republican)
 House District 4: John Moolenaar (Republican)
 House District 5: Dan Kildee (Democrat)
 House District 6: Fred Upton (Republican)
 House District 7: Tim Walberg (Republican)
 House District 8: Mike Bishop (Republican)
 House District 9: Sander Levin (Democrat)
 House District 10: Candice Miller (Republican)
 House District 11: David Trott (Republican)
 House District 12: Debbie Dingell (Democrat)
 House District 13: John Conyers (Democrat)
 House District 14: Brenda Lawrence (Democrat)

Population
In the 2010 United States Census, Michigan was recorded as having a population of 9,883,640 persons, ranking as the eighth most populous state in the country.

The state's largest cities, having populations of at least 75,000 based on 2016 estimates, were as follows:

Sports

Baseball
 2015 Detroit Tigers season – 
 2015 Michigan Wolverines baseball team - 
 2015 Michigan Wolverines softball team -

American football
 2015 Detroit Lions season – 
 2015 Michigan Wolverines football team - 
 2015 Michigan State Spartans football team - 
 2015 Western Michigan Broncos football team - 
 2015 Central Michigan Chippewas football team - 
 2015 Eastern Michigan Eagles football team -

Basketball
 2014–15 Detroit Pistons season – 
 2014–15 Michigan State Spartans men's basketball team - 
 2014–15 Michigan Wolverines men's basketball team - 
 2014–15 Detroit Titans men's basketball team - 
 2014–15 Michigan State Spartans women's basketball team - 
 2014–15 Michigan Wolverines women's basketball team -

Ice hockey
 2014–15 Detroit Red Wings season – 
 2014–15 Michigan Wolverines men's ice hockey team - In their 28th season under head coach Red Berenson, the Wolverines compiled a 22–15 record.
 2014–15 Michigan State Spartans men's ice hockey team - Under head coach Tom Anastos, the Spartans compiled a 17–16–2 record.

Racing
 Port Huron to Mackinac Boat Race - 
 Pure Michigan 400 - 
 Detroit Grand Prix - not held

Other
 Michigan Open -

Music

Chronology of events

January

February

March

April

May

June

July

August

September

October

November

December

Deaths
 January 9 - Roy Tarpley, University of Michigan basketball player (1982–1986), at age 50 in Texas
 February 2 - Dave Bergman, Detroit Tigers first baseman (1984–1992), at age 61 in Grosse Pointe Woods
 April 16 - Robert P. Griffin, U.S. Senator from Michigan (1966–1979), at age 91 in Traverse City, Michigan
 April 17 - A. Alfred Taubman, businessman and entrepreneur, at age 91 in Bloomfield Hills
 April 26 - Marcel Pronovost, Hall of Fame player for Detroit Red Wings (1949–65), at age 84 in Windsor, Ontario
 April 29 - Calvin Peete, professional golfer and Detroit native, at age 71 in Atlanta
 June 5 - Jane Briggs Hart, aviator and Detroit native, at age 93 in Connecticut
 June 23 - Tommy Hudspeth, Detroit Lions head coach (1976-1977), at age 83 in Oklahoma
 July 2 - Charlie Sanders, Hall of Fame tight end for Detroit Lions (1968–1977), at age 68 in Royal Oak
 August 3 - Mel Farr, Detroit Lions running back (1967–1973) and automobile dealer, at age 70 in Detroit
 August 29 - Wayne Dyer, self-help author and Detroit native, at age 75 in Hawaii
 October 12 - Joan Leslie, actress and Detroit native, at age 90 in Los Angeles
 October 19 - Bill Daley, All-American back for Michigan in 1943, at age 96 in Minnesota
 December 22 - Daisy Elliott, politician and realtor, at age 98 in Detroit

Gallery of 2015 deaths

See also
 History of Michigan
 History of Detroit

References